Khak-e Sefid may refer to:
 Khak-e Sefid, Kerman
 Khak-e Sefid, Sistan and Baluchestan